Gilles Mimouni (born 1956) is a French architect and film director. He is mainly known for the feature film L'Appartement (1996) - a tense romantic thriller starring Vincent Cassel, Monica Bellucci, and Romane Bohringer, and he acted as executive producer for its U.S remake Wicker Park (2004).

References

External links 

1956 births
Filmmakers who won the Best Foreign Language Film BAFTA Award
French film directors
Living people